The 2014 Oklahoma City Energy FC season is the club's first season in existence, and their first season playing in the USL Pro, the third tier of the American soccer pyramid. It is the first time a professional soccer club is playing in the state of Oklahoma since 2000, when the Tulsa Roughnecks disbanded.

Background

Review 
Oklahoma City Energy FC played its first ever match against University of Nebraska-Omaha, the match being a friendly. Five other pre-season friendlies were scheduled against Oral Roberts University, Northeastern State University, Tyler Junior College, Midwestern State University, and Southern Methodist University. The Energy went 5-0-1 in their preseason.
The Energy finished the season 9-14-5, in tenth place in the USL Pro and did not qualify for the playoffs.

Roster

Competitions

Preseason

USL Pro

Results summary

Standings

U.S. Open Cup 

Oklahoma City Energy FC will enter the U.S. Open Cup in the second round.

Statistics

Transfers

Transfers In

Loans in

References 

Oklahoma City
American soccer clubs 2014 season
2014 in sports in Oklahoma
Soccer in Oklahoma
2014